The Beretta Elite II is an air pistol manufactured by Umarex and distributed in the United States by Umarex USA. It has only a few similarities to the Beretta 92G Elite II, but it does have its good features. It is made of polymer, but it has a steel magazine, trigger, magazine release button, and  chamber. Its magazine holds 19 .177 caliber (4.5mm) BBs, is powered by 12 gram  cartridges, is double action only, and has a safety catch, but not on the original place a Beretta 92 would have it. The Beretta 92 safety catch is visible, but does not work.

Statistics 

Loudness- About 3-Medium
Weight- .
Barrel Length- 4.80 inches
Overall Length- 8.50 inches
Capacity- 19 rounds
Barrel- Smoothbore
Velocity- 
Front Sight- Blade and Ramp
Scopeable- No, but it does have an accessory rail, for a light or laser.
Trigger Action- Double Action Only
Trigger Adjust- Single Stage
Buttplate- None
Action- semi-automatic
Powered By- 12 Gram  Gas Cylinders
Safety- Manual
Manufacturer- Umarex USA
made in-1994

Similarities and Differences from the 92G Elite II 

It does not have the standard silver slide.
The 92G Elite II had no accessory rail.
The trigger seems to be bigger, as the size on a Beretta 92FS.
The Elite II 92G didn't have as much polymer as the Elite II Umarex has.
The hammer pin is the same, however, it does not work.
The barrel size is bigger, such as a Beretta 92FS would have.
A grip for the 92G Elite II was similar to the one supplied on the Umarex Elite II.
The exposed front barrel was not available on the 92G Elite II.

Elite II